A New Deal for Trunk Roads in England was a response by the United Kingdom Government's Department for Transport to A New Deal for Transport: Better for everyone - a report that reviewed the government's strategic roads programme, based on criteria of accessibility, safety, economy, environment and integration.

The recommendations made in the response were:
To move the Highways Agency in a new direction.
To create a core network of routes of national importance.
To improve maintenance, use and planning arrangements for trunk roads.
To create dedicated budgets to address noise pollution and road safety.
To create a targeted programme of large-scale improvements to the road system.

References

See also
 M11 link road protest

Transport policy in the United Kingdom
Roads in the United Kingdom
Roads in England